Adipur Junction railway station is a railway station in Kutch district, Gujarat, India on the Western line of the Western railway network. It is connected to Mundra Port by rail.

Nearby stations

Gandhidham is nearest railway station towards , whereas  is nearest railway station towards .

Major trains

Following trains halt at Adipur Junction railway station:

 19115/16 Sayajinagari Express
 22955/56 Kutch Express
 14321/22 Ala Hazrat Express (via Bhildi)
 14311/12 Ala Hazrat Express (via Ahmedabad)
 11091/92 Bhuj–Pune Express
 19151/52 Palanpur–Bhuj Intercity Express
 22829/30 Shalimar–Bhuj Weekly Superfast Express

References 

Railway stations in Kutch district
Ahmedabad railway division
Railway junction stations in Gujarat
Transport in Bhuj